Charitometridae is a family of crinoids or feather stars in the phylum Echinodermata.

Genera
The following genera are recognised by the World Register of Marine Species:
 Charitometra AH Clark, 1907
 Charitometra basicurva (Carpenter, 1888)
 Charitometra incisa (Carpenter, 1888)
 Chlorometra AH Clark, 1909
 Chlorometra garrettiana (AH Clark, 1907)
 Chondrometra AH Clark, 1916
 Chondrometra aculeata (Carpenter, 1888)
 Chondrometra crosnieri Marshall & Rowe, 1981
 Chondrometra robusta (AH Clark, 1911)
 Chondrometra rugosa AH Clark, 1918
 Crinometra AH Clark, 1909
 Crinometra brevipinna (Pourtalès, 1868)
 Glyptometra AH Clark, 1909
 Glyptometra angusticalyx (Carpenter, 1884)
 Glyptometra crassa (AH Clark, 1912)
 Glyptometra distincta (Carpenter, 1888)
 Glyptometra inaequalis (Carpenter, 1888)
 Glyptometra invenusta (AH Clark, 1909)
 Glyptometra investigatoris (AH Clark, 1909)
 Glyptometra lata (AH Clark, 1907)
 Glyptometra lateralis (AH Clark, 1908)
 Glyptometra levigata (AH Clark, 1909)
 Glyptometra macilenta (AH Clark, 1909)
 Glyptometra sclateri (Bell, 1905)
 Glyptometra septentrionalis (AH Clark, 1911)
 Glyptometra sparksi (John, 1937)
 Glyptometra timorensis AH Clark, 1912
 Glyptometra tuberosa (Carpenter, 1888)
 Monachometra AH Clark, 1916
 Monachometra flexilis (Carpenter, 1888)
 Monachometra fragilis (AH Clark, 1912)
 Monachometra kermadecensis McKnight, 1977
 Monachometra patula (Carpenter, 1888)
 Monachometra robusta (Carpenter, 1888)
 Poecilometra AH Clark, 1907
 Poecilometra acoela (Carpenter, 1888)
 Poecilometra scalaris (AH Clark, 1907)
 Strotometra AH Clark, 1909
 Strotometra hepburniana (AH Clark, 1907)
 Strotometra ornatissimus AH Clark, 1912
 Strotometra parvipinna (Carpenter, 1888)
 Strotometra priamus AH Clark, 1912

References

Comatulida